Karen Dillon may refer to:
 Karen Dillon (journalist)
 Karen Dillon (filmmaker)